Chen Zheng (616–677) courtesy name Yimin, pseudonym Suxuan, was a Tang Dynasty general from Gushi County in Henan, China.

Chen Zheng was the son of Tang general Chen Ke (陳克) and the father of Chen Yuanguang. Together with son Chen Yuanguang, he was responsible for opening up and developing the city of Zhangzhou. His father was Chen Kegeng (陳克耕).

References
《漳州府志》
https://inf.news/en/culture/22b8c5d198b3a311876d93d14f80ecde.html
https://lujuba.cc/en/401225.html

616 births
677 deaths
People from Xinyang
Tang dynasty generals from Henan